The Federation of Progressive Unions (FPU) is a national trade union center in Mauritius. It has a membership of 35,000 and is affiliated with the International Trade Union Confederation.

References

Trade unions in Mauritius
International Trade Union Confederation